Michael Patrick Patton is a New Zealand rugby league footballer who represented New Zealand in six Test matches, including matches that counted towards the 1992 World Cup.

Playing career
Patton originally played for the Mangere East Hawks in the Auckland Rugby League competition and won the Lipscombe Cup in 1985 as the ARL's sportsman of the year. Patton spent the 1986 season with the Manukau Magpies. An Auckland representative, Patton again won the Lipscombe Cup in 1987, although by this time he was playing for the Glenora Bears.

He was called up into the New Zealand in 1990 and played in six Test matches, coming off the bench in all of them.

In 1992 he won the Rothville Trophy as the ARL player of the year.

Later years
Patton went on to become a self-made millionaire.

References

1966 births
Living people
Auckland rugby league team players
New Zealand rugby league players
New Zealand national rugby league team players
Rugby league five-eighths
Glenora Bears players
Mangere East Hawks players
Manukau Magpies players